The Minister for the purposes of the Atlantic Canada Opportunities Agency Act, more commonly the Minister for the Atlantic Canada Opportunities Agency or Minister of the Atlantic Canada Opportunities Agency, is the member of the Cabinet of Canada who also serves as the chief executive of the Atlantic Canada Opportunities Agency (ACOA). The post is traditionally held by an MP from Atlantic Canada, although occasionally the responsibilities have been accorded to a more senior cabinet minister.

Ministers
Key:

References

Atlantic Canada Opportunities Agency
Atlantic Canada
Regionalism (politics)